Sardar Vallabhbhai Patel Stadium is an Indian sports stadium located in the Navrangpura locality of Ahmedabad, Gujarat. It is sometimes referred as Sports Club of Gujarat Stadium. The stadium holds the honor of hosting the first One Day International match played in India. Once a new stadium of the same name came up in Motera in 1982, the Sardar (Vallabhbhai) Patel stadium hasn't been used for international cricket matches. The stadium is one of the home grounds of the Gujarat cricket team that plays in domestic tournament of Ranji Trophy. It is equipped with floodlights for day-and-night games and is a regular venue during Indian domestic cricket season.

The Sardar (Vallabhbhai) Patel Stadium is owned by Ahmedabad Municipal Corporation. The stadium is situated in the heart of the city. It is mainly used for Cricket, but it has also played host to a number of programs arranged by the Government of Gujarat.

History and development

In the early 1950s, the Province of Bombay gifted 80000 sq yards of land to the Cricket Club of Ahmedabad (CCA) to construct a grand Cricket Stadium and a Club House. CCA handed over the project as well as the land to the Ahmedabad Municipal Corporation at a token price. It was agreed to have a separate management for the Stadium and the Club House and that the original members of the CCA would form a new club, christened The Sports Club of Gujarat Ltd.

Sheth Chinubhai Chimanbhai, leading industrialist and former Mayor of Ahmedabad, went out of his way to hire the world-renowned architect Charles Correa to design both the Stadium and the Club House. Charles Correa, a master of modern progressive architecture also happens to be the designer of the Gandhi-Ashram on the banks of Sabarmati River, which is a standing physical manifestation of the Gandhian philosophy.

As far as the stadium is concerned, the entire roof of the huge stadium with a seating capacity of 50,000 is designed to be supported on only one point! A unique cantilever, pillar-less stadium - the very first of its kind in India! Due to unforeseen circumstances, only one wing could be completed. Apart from Sheth Chinubhai Chimanbhai, the other founder members were Narottam K Jhaveri, Martandrai G. Shastri, Jayantilal Chimanlal Kusumgar, Jitendra Jiwanlal Thakore, Hariprasad Keshariprasad Thakore & Ramanlal C Parikh.

The seating capacity will go up to about 110,000 after The Sardar Patel Cricket Stadium, Ahmedabad, renovation works are complete and venue opens up in 2019.

International cricket

The stadium hosted its only ODI Match and first played in India on 25 November 1981. The match was played between India and England. The match was reduced to 46 overs. India scored 156 for 7. Dilip Vengsarkar top scored with 46 runs. England replied with 160 for 5 and won the match by five wickets and 13 balls to spare. Mike Gatting and Ian Botham were unbeaten on 47 and 25 respectively.

Once a new stadium came up in Motera in 1982, the Sardar (Vallabhbhai) Patel stadium hasn't been used for international cricket matches. The Motera Stadium now hosts all ODI Matches and Test Matches in the city.

Indian Cricket League

During 2008 season of Indian Cricket League(ICL), the stadium was chosen as one of the venues for the tournament, others venues being Hyderabad, Gurgaon and Panchkula. Prior to the tournament the ICL spent 100 million (10 crore) for renovation of the stadium and 30-40 million for floodlights, apart from improving the pitch, outfield, and dressing rooms.

The stadium hosted 12 matches during the T20 tournament. The stadium was scheduled to host all seven matches of ICL World Series, but the tournament was canceled after 4 matches due to the Mumbai terrorist attacks.

Swarnim Gujarat

The stadium played host to Swarnim Gujarat fest, golden jubilee celebrations of the foundation of Gujarat state, on 30 April and 1 May 2010. The dazzling show was put up at the Navrangpura stadium in the city. The stadium was decked up at the cost of Rs 5 crore. The renovation work included construction of public toilets, pathways, drinking water facilities and VIP foyer area inside the stadium.

The civic body also made the stadium weather proof. The whole stadium was silicon painted. The transparent silicon paint will provide weather resistance mechanism to the building.

In brilliantly synchronised multimedia show that began with fireworks, the story of Gujarat from pre-historic era, through the era of Siddhraj Jaisingh, sultan Ahmed Shah, the landing of Parsis at Sanjan and the separation from Bombay state to become a separate entity in 1960, was narrated before a jam packed crowd at the Sardar Patel stadium.

There were at least 20,000 participants from across the country, doing the enactment of the state's history based on a film that ran simultaneously. More than 50,000 spectators & VIPs came to the stadium to attend the golden jubilee celebrations of the foundation of Gujarat state. Outside, a huge crowd, including bureaucrats, politicians and other VVIPs, struggled to be a part of the celebrations and got turned away by the security guards, because the stadium was packed far beyond its capacity.

As news of the chaos and agitation spread, Chief Minister Narendra Modi apologized and promised that the same programme would be repeated on Sunday for the benefit of those left out. The second day of the celebration also witnessed the same interest in terms of attendance.

See also
Sardar Patel Stadium, Motera

References

External links

  Cricinfo Website - Ground Page
 cricketarchive Website - Ground Page
 Cricruns.com - Ground Details
 Sports Club of Gujarat Ltd. - Official Website 

Cricket grounds in Gujarat
Sports venues in Ahmedabad
Charles Correa buildings
Indian Cricket League stadiums
Sports venues completed in 1960
1960 establishments in Gujarat
20th-century architecture in India